The 1951 San Diego mayoral election was held on April 17, 1951 to elect the mayor for San Diego. Incumbent mayor Harley E. Knox did not stand for reelection. In the primary election, Gerald C. Crary and John D. Butler received the most votes and advanced to a runoff election. Butler was then elected mayor with a majority of the votes in the runoff.

Candidates
John D. Butler, attorney
Gerald C. Crary, former member of the San Diego City Council
Fred A. Rhodes, former City Manager and Public Works Director
Lilliam A. Johnson, realtor
Hugh V. Knox, former reporter
Clifton L. Voorhies, golf professional
Edwin F. Murphy, realtor

Campaign
Incumbent Mayor Harley E. Knox chose not stand for reelection on the advice of his physician. On March 13, 1951, Gerald C. Crary came first in the primary election with 33.5 percent of the vote, followed by John D. Butler with 25.9 percent. Because no candidate received a majority of the vote, Crary and Butler advanced to a runoff election. On April 17, 1951, Butler received 59.6 percent of the vote in the runoff and was elected to the office of the mayor. Butler was the youngest mayor to have been elected as well as the first to be born in San Diego.

Primary Election results

General Election results

References

1951
1951 in California
1951 United States mayoral elections
1951
April 1951 events in the United States